In enzymology, a [ribulose-bisphosphate carboxylase]-lysine N-methyltransferase is an enzyme that catalyzes the chemical reaction

S-adenosyl-L-methionine + [ribulose-1,5-bisphosphate carboxylase]-lysine  S-adenosyl-L-homocysteine + [ribulose-1,5-bisphosphate carboxylase]-N-methyl-L-lysine

Thus, the two substrates of this enzyme are S-adenosyl methionine and ribulose-1,5-bisphosphate carboxylase-lysine, whereas its two products are S-adenosylhomocysteine and ribulose-1,5-bisphosphate carboxylase-N6-methyl-L-lysine.

Transferase Family
This enzyme belongs to the family of transferases, specifically those transferring one-carbon group methyltransferases.  

The systematic name of this enzyme class is S-adenosyl-L-methionine:[3-phospho-D-glycerate-carboxy-lyase (dimerizing)]-lysine N6-methyltransferase. 

Other names in common use include rubisco methyltransferase, ribulose-bisphosphate-carboxylase/oxygenase N-methyltransferase, ribulose-1,5-bisphosphate carboxylase/oxygenase large subunit, epsilonN-methyltransferase, S-adenosyl-L-methionine:[3-phospho-D-glycerate-carboxy-lyase, and (dimerizing)]-lysine 6-N-methyltransferase.

Structural studies

References
 
 

EC 2.1.1
Enzymes of known structure